The 2006 Italian Figure Skating Championships was held in Sesto San Giovanni from January 5 through 8, 2006. Skaters competed in the disciplines of men's singles, ladies' singles, ice dancing, and synchronized skating. The results were used to choose the teams to the 2006 Winter Olympics, the 2006 World Championships, the 2006 European Championships, and the 2006 World Junior Championships.

Senior results

Men

Ladies

Ice dancing

External links
 results

Italian Figure Skating Championships
2005 in figure skating
Italian Figure Skating Championships, 2006
2006 in Italian sport